Vashnam or Veshnam or Voshnam may refer to:
 Vashnam-e Dari
 Vashnam-e Dust Mohammad
 Vashnam-e Eshaq
 Vashnam-e Faqir Mohammad
 Vashnam-e Hajji Ramazan
 Vashnam-e Heydar Saleh Zahi
 Vashnam-e Kheyr Mohammad
 Vashnam-e Mirgol
 Vashnam-e Morid
 Vashnam-e Shahdad